Bonk may refer to:

People 
 Bonk (surname)

Arts and entertainment 
 Bonk (video game series), a caveman character and video game series
Bonk!, a soft drink company in the first-person shooting game Team Fortress 2
 Bonk (album), an album by Big Pig
 Bonk, an early 1980s new wave band fronted by vocalist Barry Flynn of the Big Supreme

Other uses 
 Bonk: The Curious Coupling of Science and Sex, a 2008 book by Mary Roach
 14965 Bonk, a main-belt asteroid
 Bonk (audio format) supported by fre:ac (formerly known as BonkEnc)
 The bonk, or hitting the wall, sudden fatigue and loss of energy in endurance sports

See also 
 
 
 Bonken, a Dutch card game
 Bonkers (disambiguation)
 Boink, a magazine of erotica